Sleeping with the Enemy is a novel written by Nancy Price and published in 1987.  It served as the basis for Sleeping with the Enemy, a 1991 film starring Julia Roberts and Patrick Bergin, which was remade a number of times.

Notes

1987 American novels
American novels adapted into films
Domestic violence in fiction